Nuutinen is a Finnish surname. Notable people with the surname include:

Emma Nuutinen (born 1996), Finnish ice hockey player
Harri Nuutinen (born 1962), Finnish singer
Matti Nuutinen (born 1990), Finnish basketball player
Mikko Nuutinen (born 1990), Finnish ice hockey player
Quinndary Weatherspoon (born 1997), Nicaraguan professional basketball player for the Golden State Warriors of the National Basketball Association

Finnish-language surnames